The Siemens Synthesizer (or "Siemens Studio für Elektronische Musik") was developed in Germany in 1959 by the German electronics manufacturer Siemens, originally to compose live electronic music for its own promotional films.

From 1956 to 1967, it had a significant influence on the development of electronic music. Among others, Mauricio Kagel, Henri Pousseur, Herbert Brün and Ernst Krenek completed important electronic works there.

History 
In 1955, Siemens established an audio laboratory, the Siemens Studio für Elektronische Musik, in its Munich facilities to produce electronic music for its publicity films. Siemens engineers Helmut Klein and Alexander Schaaf were charged with assembling the components for the studio and providing a means for controlling the composition, synthesis, and recording of music. The organization of the studio was completed by 1959. A second model was installed in 1964.

The studio was closed in 1967 but its main control room and equipment have been preserved as part of a museum exhibit at the Deutsches Museum in Munich.

From 1959 until its closure, Josef Anton Riedl was director of the studio.

Technology 
The Siemens Synthesizer was controlled by a set of four punch paper rolls controlling the timbre, envelope, pitch and volume. Equipment found in the studio included a bank of 20 oscillators, a white noise generator, a Hohnerola (a hybrid electronically amplified reed instrument marketed by Hohner) and an impulse generator. The synthesizer had a tonal range of seven octaves.

The Siemens Synthesizer offered a method for controlling its tone-generating facilities, modification and modulation of the sounds in real time, and the manipulation of recorded material into finished works.

Uses 
Between 1960 and 1966, the studio opened its doors to many outside composers, including:

 Bengt Hambraeus
Bruno Maderna
 Ernst Krenek
Henri Pousseur
 Herbert Brün
Iannis Xenakis
Josef Anton Riedl
 Karlheinz Stockhausen
 Mauricio Kagel
Milko Kelemen
 Niccolo Castiglioni
 Pierre Boulez

Gallery

See also 

 Electronic musical instrument
 List of music sequencers
List of vocoders
Music sequencer
 Recording studio
 Studio monitor
 Vocoder

Bibliography 

 Stefan Schenk: Das Siemens-Studio für elektronische Musik. In: Münchner Veröffentlichungen zur Musikgeschichte, Band 72. Hans Schneider Verlag 2014, zugleich Dissertation an der Ludwig-Maximilians Universität München 2011, . (Online)
 Wolf Loeckle:  «Was gibt’s Neues?» Josel Anton Riedl, das Elektronische Siemens-Studio, die Natur. In: Neue Zeitschrift für Musik, Ausgabe 2014/2, S. 24–27.
 Helmut Klein: Klangsynthese und Klanganalyse im elektronischen Studio. In: Frequenz – Journal for RF, Band 16/1962 Nr. 3, S. 109–114
 Siemens Kulturprogramm (Hrsg.): Siemens-Studio für elektronische Musik. München 1994
 Siemens Kulturprogramm: Siemens-Studio für elektronische Musik. audiocom multimedia, 1998 (CD mit Kompositionen aus dem Studio)

References 
Siemens

Electronic musical instruments